Carrie Ann Stroup (born May 23, 1982, in Fort Lauderdale, Florida) is an American fashion model, TV host and beauty pageant titleholder who was crowned Miss World America 2001 and represented her country in Miss World 2001 but unplaced.

Early life
The daughter of Joe and Debbie Stroup of Cashiers, North Carolina, Stroup had previously held the title of Miss United States Teen in 1998.

Miss United States World
A 2000 Smoky Mountain High School graduate, Stroup competed in Orlando, Florida for the title of Miss United States World in July 2001, capturing the crown and the right to participate in Miss World 2001.

As the official representative of her country to the Miss World 2001 pageant held in Sun City, South Africa on November 16, she became a bookies' favorite and competed against 93 delegates for the title eventually won by Agbani Darego of Nigeria.

Life after Miss United States World
Stroup is a model featured in advertisements for PlayersOnly, an online gambling site, and a senior reporter at Gambling911. She also had a guest role in NBC's Scrubs.

References

External links
 

Living people
Miss World 2001 delegates
1982 births
People from Fort Lauderdale, Florida
American beauty pageant winners
American female models
21st-century American women